Acacia inophloia, commonly known as fibre-barked wattle, is a tree or shrub belonging to the genus Acacia and the subgenus Juliflorae that is native to Western Australia.

Description
The bark is shaggy and stringy on the trunk with minni ritchi style bark of the outer branches. When new shoots form they are viscid and a bright yellow-green colour. It blooms from August to October producing yellow flowers. The simple inflorescences are arranged with one per axil.

Distribution
It is endemic to an area in the Wheatbelt and Goldfields regions of Western Australia where it grows in gravelly, sandy and loamy granitic soils. The bulk of the population is found between Quairading and Kulin and is a part of shrubland communities.

See also
List of Acacia species

References

inophloia
Acacias of Western Australia
Plants described in 1928
Taxa named by Joseph Maiden
Taxa named by William Blakely